The 1966 season was Djurgårdens IF's 66th in existence, their 21st season in Allsvenskan and their 4th consecutive season in the league. They were competing in Allsvenskan and 1966–67 Inter-Cities Fairs Cup.

Player statistics
Appearances for competitive matches only.

|}

Goals

Total

Allsvenskan

Inter-Cities Fairs Cup

Competitions

Overall

Allsvenskan

League table

Matches

Inter-Cities Fairs Cup

First round

Friendlies

References

Djurgårdens IF Fotboll seasons
Djurgarden
Swedish football championship-winning seasons